Rae is a unisex given name. The name Rae came from the Scottish/English Borderlands. It was a name for a person known as a timid or shy person. Another research revealed that the name is derived from the Old English word "ray", that referred to a doe. It may also be a short form of the female name Rachel, which means "little lamb" in Hebrew. 

The name Rae may refer to:

People
Rae Allen (1926–2022), American actress
Rae Armantrout (born 1947), American poet
Rae Baker (born 1973), British actress
Rae Bridgman, Canadian anthropologist and writer
Rae Carruth (born 1974) American football player
Rae Carson (born 1973), American writer
Rae Dawn Chong (born 1961), Canadian actress
Rae Dalven (1904–1992), American professor 
Rae Earl (born 1971), British writer
Rae L. Egbert (1891–1964), American politician
Rae Featherstone (1907–1987), Australian architect
Rae Hendrie (born 1976), Scottish actress
Rae Johnstone (1905–1964), Australian jockey
Rae Helen Langton (born 1961), Australian philosopher
Rae Morris (born 1992), British singer
Rae O'Donnell, former Hong Kong international lawn and indoor bowler
Addison Rae (born 2000), American TikToker
Charlotte Rae (1926–2018), American actress and singer
Rae Woodland (1922–2013), British singer

Fiction
Rae Cummings, fictional character on American soap opera One Life to Live
Rae Thomas, fictional character on American soap opera Passions
Rae Wilson, fictional character on British television series Hollyoaks
Shrinking Ray/Rae, superhero in the Invincible comics and it’s television adaptation.

See also
Rae Sremmurd, American hip hop duo
Rae (disambiguation)

Given names
Masculine given names
Feminine given names
Unisex given names
Hebrew unisex given names
Hebrew masculine given names
Hebrew feminine given names